This is a list of extinct languages of North America, languages which have undergone language death, have no native speakers and no spoken descendant, most of them being languages of former Native American tribes.

There are 108 languages listed.

Canada
Indigenous languages

European language dialects

Pidgin languages

Caribbean
Indigenous languages

Central America
Indigenous languages

Greenland
European language dialects

Pidgin languages

Mexico
Indigenous languages

United States
Indigenous languages

European languages or dialects

Creole languages or dialects

Pidgin languages

Sign languages

U.S. Virgin Islands
Creole languages

United States and Canada
Indigenous languages

United States and Mexico
Indigenous languages

See also
List of extinct Uto-Aztecan languages
List of extinct languages of South America
Extinct languages of the Marañón River basin

References

North America
 
Extinct languages
Native American-related lists